Enrique Alberto Ricardo IV, better known as Little Ricky, is a fictional character from the American television series I Love Lucy (1951–57, with Ricky Jr. becoming a part of the show as of his birth in 1953) and The Lucy-Desi Comedy Hour (1957–60). Little Ricky is the son of Lucy Ricardo and Ricky Ricardo.  Little Ricky lives with his parents in a New York brownstone apartment building, which is owned and run by his godparents. During the series' final season, the family moves to a suburban house in Westport, Connecticut.

Little Ricky was played by a number of actors, including James John Ganzer, twins Richard and Ronald Lee Simmons, twins Michael and Joseph Mayer and, most notably, Keith Thibodeaux, billed as Little Ricky. Although the I Love Lucy announcer and the opening credits of The Lucy-Desi Comedy Hour gave his stage name as "Little Ricky", in his post-Lucy acting career, particularly his four-year irregular stint on The Andy Griffith Show, he was billed as Richard Keith.

Fictional character biography
Lucy finds out she was expecting Little Ricky on the Season 2 episode "Lucy is Enceinte." The episode in which he is born, "Lucy goes to the Hospital," was aired on January 19, 1953, the same day as the birth of Lucille Ball's actual son, Desi Arnaz Jr.

Mother: Lucy Ricardo, played by Lucille Ball
Father: Ricky Ricardo, played by Desi Arnaz
Maternal Grandmother: Mrs. MacGillicuddy, played by Kathryn Card
Godfather: Fred Mertz played by William Frawley
Godmother: Ethel Mertz played by Vivian Vance
Babysitter: Mrs. Matilda Trumball played by Elizabeth Patterson
Classmates: Stevie Appleby and Bruce Ramsey.

Little Ricky's father buys him a set of drums in the season 6 episode "Little Ricky Learns to play the Drums," after he shows he can carry a beat while tapping his spoon on a glass during a family breakfast. His parents enroll him in a music school where he is the only drummer, where he forms a band named "Ricky Ricardo and the Dixieland Band." Little Ricky experiences stage fright before his first music school recital but seems to overcome stage fright as he performs comfortably in many other episodes, such as "The Ricardos Visit Cuba," where he plays the conga drum alongside his father; "Little Ricky's School Pageant," where he plays the lead; and "Ragtime Band," where Little Ricky plays the drums alongside his mother and godparents.

Episode appearances

References

Child characters in television
Fictional characters from Connecticut
Fictional characters from New York City
I Love Lucy characters
Television characters introduced in 1953